The Standard of Revolt (original French title: Le drapeau rouge, The Red Flag) is a French socialist and anarchist revolutionary song written in 1877 by Paul Brousse to the melody of the Swiss patriotic song Les bords de la libre Sarine by Jacques Vogt. 

The English translation by M.L. Korr, published in 1932, is not based directly on the original French, but on the substantially modified Polish 1882 version by Bolesław Czerwieński, titled Czerwony sztandar, which became the anthem of the Polish Socialist Party. Czerwieński's lyrics were also the basis for Czech, German, Hungarian, Latvian, Romanian, Russian, Ukrainian, Yiddish and other translations.

Lyrics and variants

French versions

Translations

References

Political party songs
Anarchist songs
Protest songs
1877 songs
Socialist symbols
French songs
Songs about revolutions